The following is a list of the highest-grossing films from the Mexican film industry.



Box office gross revenue 
The following is a list of the highest-grossing films within the Mexican film industry, based on box office gross revenue. Audience count not included.

''Background colour  indicates films that are currently playing in theaters (as of January 2020)

Box office ticket sales 
The following is a list of Mexican films that have had the highest ticket sales at the worldwide box office.

References

Mexico
Highest-grossing films